The 2010 GEMAX Open was a professional tennis tournament played on carpet courts. It was part of the Tretorn SERIE+ of the 2010 ATP Challenger Tour. It took place in Belgrade, Serbia between 15 and 21 February 2010.

ATP entrants

Seeds

 Rankings are as of February 8, 2010.

Other entrants
The following players received wildcards into the singles main draw:
  Nikola Ćaćić
  Filip Krajinović
  Dušan Lajović
  Janko Tipsarević

The following players received entry from the qualifying draw:
  Jan Minář
  Filip Prpic
  Martin Slanar
  Simon Stadler

The following player received special exempt into the main draw:
 Gilles Müller

Champions

Singles

 Karol Beck def.  Ilija Bozoljac, 7–5, 7–6(4)

Doubles

 Ilija Bozoljac /  Jamie Delgado def.  Dustin Brown /  Martin Slanar, 6–3, 6–3

External links

GEMAX Open
Tennis tournaments in Serbia
GEMAX Open
GEMAX Open
GEMAX Open